Adrian Beck (born 9 June 1997) is a German professional footballer who plays as a midfielder for  club 1. FC Heidenheim.

Career
Born in Crailsheim, Beck spent time with TSG 1899 Hoffenheim, TSG 1899 Hoffenheim II, SSV Ulm 1846 and Union Saint-Gilloise, before moving on loan to Scottish club Hamilton Academical in September 2019. The loan ended on 30 January 2020 and the following day, he returned to SSV Ulm 1846.

On 11 May 2022, Beck signed a three-year contract with 1. FC Heidenheim beginning on 1 July 2022.

References

1997 births
Living people
German footballers
Association football midfielders
TSG 1899 Hoffenheim players
TSG 1899 Hoffenheim II players
SSV Ulm 1846 players
Royale Union Saint-Gilloise players
Hamilton Academical F.C. players
1. FC Heidenheim players
Regionalliga players
Challenger Pro League players
Scottish Professional Football League players
2. Bundesliga players
German expatriate footballers
German expatriate sportspeople in Belgium
Expatriate footballers in Belgium
German expatriate sportspeople in Scotland
Expatriate footballers in Scotland